Ōtāne is a town in the Central Hawke's Bay District and the Hawke's Bay region, on the east coast of New Zealand's North Island. The small village, has a school, general store, cafe and pub, and is located just off State Highway 2.

History 
The town was founded in 1874, during a subdivision of Henry Tiffen's 5140-hectare Homewood farming estate. The first sales of Kaikora township sections were on 26 March 1874. It became the centre of the Pātangata County from 1885 to 1977. The county took its name from a nearby Māori pā.

Name 
On 1 April 1910 the Post Department changed the name from Kaikora North to Otane, to avoid confusion with Kaikōura. The name of the railway station was changed a month later. An 1869 advert mentioned Otane bush, Kaikora.

In July 2020, the name of the locality was officially gazetted as Ōtāne by the New Zealand Geographic Board, having previously often been written as Otane.

Library 
Tenders for a new public library were invited in 1883 and it was open by 1884. It was replaced in 1929 by a building which also contained council and medical offices. It is now occupied by McCaulay's cafe and store. A war memorial is next to the former library.

Railway station
Initially the township was served by mail coaches running between Napier and Waipukurau. Ōtāne (at that time Kaikora) railway station opened on Monday 28 August 1876, when the railway was extended from Te Aute to Waipawa. as part of the Palmerston North–Gisborne Line. It was part of the Paki Paki to Waipukurau contract, tendered on 9 July 1874 for £19,532 by Charles McKirdy, of Wellington, who built the Rimutaka Incline and several other lines. A local contractor tendered £29,173. There were allegations of mismanagement and disputes about the contracts. However, in 1876, the Minister for Public Works, Edward Richardson, attributed delays only to unexpectedly heavy land claims and floods. S Tracey and Allen, of Napier, tendered £7,989 for track for the Paki Paki-Waipawa length in September 1875. Ōtāne started with 2 trains a day in each direction, increased to 3 in 1883 and 4 in 1896.

By March 1876 Justin McSweeney had built a platform and station, McLeod & Co a 5th class stationmaster's house and Joseph Sowry a goods shed and water tank. In 1884 the station was enlarged and a loading ramp, cattle and sheep yards added. That station burnt down on 1 February 1894. By 1896 Kaikora had a  5th class station, platform ( long in 1926), cart approach,  x  goods shed, loading bank, cattle yards, stationmaster's house, urinals and a passing loop for 26 wagons. In 1940 the loop was extended for 80 wagons. There was a Post Office at the station from 1883 to 1912. In 1912 an automatic tablet exchanger was added.  Railway houses were built in 1927, 1945 and 1953. In 1966 a new  station was built of concrete blocks, with an aluminium roof on the same site. On 9 October 1967 Ōtāne closed as an officered station and on 8 June 1985 it closed to all traffic. Only a short platform remains.

Demographics

Ōtāne had a population of 669 at the 2018 New Zealand census, an increase of 129 people (23.9%) since the 2013 census, and an increase of 153 people (29.7%) since the 2006 census. There were 246 households, comprising 318 males and 348 females, giving a sex ratio of 0.91 males per female, with 135 people (20.2%) aged under 15 years, 90 (13.5%) aged 15 to 29, 327 (48.9%) aged 30 to 64, and 105 (15.7%) aged 65 or older.

Ethnicities were 70.4% European/Pākehā, 35.9% Māori, 3.1% Pacific peoples, 2.7% Asian, and 2.7% other ethnicities. People may identify with more than one ethnicity.

Although some people chose not to answer the census's question about religious affiliation, 54.3% had no religion, 30.5% were Christian, 2.7% had Māori religious beliefs, 0.9% were Hindu and 0.4% had other religions.

Of those at least 15 years old, 57 (10.7%) people had a bachelor's or higher degree, and 144 (27.0%) people had no formal qualifications. 33 people (6.2%) earned over $70,000 compared to 17.2% nationally. The employment status of those at least 15 was that 261 (48.9%) people were employed full-time, 69 (12.9%) were part-time, and 24 (4.5%) were unemployed.

Education 
Ōtāne School is a Year 1–8 co-educational state primary school.

Argyll East School is a Year 1–8 co-educational state primary school.

References

Central Hawke's Bay District
Populated places in the Hawke's Bay Region